Baozi, Pao-tsih or bao, is a type of yeast-leavened filled bun in various Chinese cuisines. There are many variations in fillings (meat or vegetarian) and preparations, though the buns are most often steamed. They are a variation of mantou from Northern China.

Each order consists of a steamer containing between three and ten pieces. A small ceramic dish for dipping the baozi is provided for vinegar or soy sauce, both of which are available in bottles at the table, along with various types of chili and garlic pastes, oils or infusions, fresh coriander and leeks, sesame oil, and other flavorings. They are popular throughout China and have made their way into the cuisines of many other countries through the Chinese diaspora.

History and etymology
Written records from the Song dynasty show the term baozi in use for filled buns. Prior to the Northern Song Dynasty (960–1279), the word mantou was used for both filled and unfilled buns. According to legend, the filled baozi is a variation of manta invented by military strategist Zhuge Liang. Over time mantou came to indicate only unfilled buns in Mandarin and some varieties of Chinese, although the Wu Chinese languages continue to use mantou to refer to both filled and unfilled buns.

Types

Outside of China

In many Chinese cultures, these buns are a popular food, and widely available. While they can be eaten at any meal, baozi are often eaten for breakfast.  They are also popular as a portable snack or meal.

The dish has also become common place throughout various regions of north Asia with cultural and ethnic relationships, as well as Southeast Asia and outside Asia due to long standing Chinese immigration.

 In Buryatia and Mongolia, the variants of the recipe, often with beef or lamb, are known as buuz and buuza.
Given the long history of the Chinese diaspora in Malaysia way before the British colonial years of British Malaya times, the Malays have adopted these buns as their own. A particularly Malay form of the baozi (called pau in Malay) is filled with potato curry, chicken curry, or beef curry that are similar to the fillings of Malay curry puffs. Some variants have a quail egg in the middle, in addition to the curry. Other variations include Kaya (jam) or red bean paste as the filling. Due to the high number of Muslims in Malaysia, these buns are halal and contain no pork. One can find Malay stalls selling the buns by the roadside, at pasar malams (night markets), highway rest stops, and pasar Ramadans (Ramadan food bazaars).
 Similarly, in Indonesia the dish has been adopted into Indonesian cuisine through the integration of Chinese culture. It has been adopted through the Hokkien name of bakpau or bakpao. In addition to meat fillings, local variants include: chocolate, sweet potato, and marmalade filling. Bakpau is found in Indonesia as a take away food sold by cart street hawkers. Bakpau in Indonesia is usually sold in dabao size (lit.: "big pau"), around 10 cm in diameter. To accommodate the dietary restrictions of Indonesia's Muslim majority, the original pork filling has been replaced with minced beef, diced chicken, or even sweet mung bean paste and red bean paste. Pau with non-meat fillings are still called bakpau by Indonesians, despite the lack of meat. It is usually served with sweet chili sauce.
 As a colonial influence from Indonesia, at supermarkets in the Netherlands one can easily find frozen, or sometimes in the bigger supermarkets cooled, bapao or bakpao wrapped in plastic, ready-made to be heated inside a microwave. The most prevalent filling is chicken, although there are pork and beef variants available as well. This food is culturally categorized as a quick snack or a fast-food item. Fresh forms of this steamed bun are not seen outside of the Chinese community within the country.
 In the Philippines, their version of baozi is called siopao brought by Chinese immigrants (Sangleys) prior to Spanish colonialism. Varieties of Filipino siopao fillings include barbecued pork, meatballs, flaked tuna, and sometimes chocolate and cheese.
 A similar concept is also present in Thailand, called salapao (ซาลาเปา).
 Baozi is also very popular in Japan where it's known as chūkaman (中華まん, "Chinese steamed bun"). Nikuman (肉まん; derived from 肉饅頭, nikumanjū) is the Japanese name for Chinese baozi with meat fillings. Chūkaman are steamed and often sold as street food. During festivals, they are frequently sold and eaten. From about August or September, through the winter months until roughly the beginning of April, chūkaman are available at convenience stores, where they are kept hot. It's also available as chilled food in supermarket and a part of usual food. 
 In Korea, where it's known as hoppang, it is a warm snack sold throughout South Korea. It is a convenience food version of jjinppang (steamed bread), typically filled with smooth, sweetened red bean paste and also commonly sold stuffed with vegetables and meat, pizza toppings, pumpkin, or buldak.
 Baozi is called num pav in Cambodia. It is a popular snack in Cambodia and is usually homemade or sold in street markets. 
 Bánh bao is the Vietnamese version of the Cantonese tai bao that was brought over by Chinese immigrants.
 The Myanmar version is called pauk-si and is a popular snack available in almost every traditional tea shops.
In Mauritius, many Mauritian dishes are influenced by Sino-Mauritians; this includes baozi which is simply referred as "pao" (sometimes written as "pow" or "paw"). They can either be savoury (i.e. typically filled with Chinese sausage, poultry, black mushroom and soy egg; or filled with cha siu) or sweet (i.e. filled with sweet paste). They are very popular among Mauritian families and continues to remain an omnipresent part of Sino-Mauritian culture.

See also 

List of buns
List of steamed foods
Siopao
Cha siu bao
Manapua

References

Chinese breads
Chinese cuisine
Mauritian cuisine
Dim sum
Dumplings
Steamed buns
Stuffed dishes